Zackary Momoh (born July 1988) is a British actor. He began his career in theatre and made his feature film debut in A United Kingdom (2016). On television, he is known for his roles in the Netflix crime drama Seven Seconds (2018) and the HBO fantasy series The Nevers (2021).

Early life
Momoh was born in the South London Borough of Lambeth. He is of Nigerian descent. He participated in talent shows growing up. He began his studies in business marketing at university before deciding he wanted to pursue a career in acting. He trained part-time at Identity School of Acting (IDSA).

Filmography

Film

Television

Stage

Awards and nominations

References

External links

Living people
1988 births
Black British male actors
English male stage actors
English people of Nigerian descent
Male actors from London
People from the London Borough of Lambeth